Jacob Liddle (born 27 October 1996) is an Australian professional rugby league footballer who plays as a  for the St George Illawarra Dragons in the NRL.

He previously played for the Wests Tigers in the National Rugby League

Background
Liddle was born in Gosford, New South Wales, Australia. He studied at Wadalba Community School.

He played his junior rugby league for the Wyong Roos, before being signed by the Wests Tigers.

Playing career

Early career
In November and December 2014, Liddle played for the Australian Schoolboys. In 2015 and 2016, he played for the Wests Tigers' NYC team, and he was named the team's Player's Player in 2015. He played for the New South Wales under-20s team against the Queensland under-20s team in 2015, and was selected again in 2016, but decided to forgo the match to make his first-grade debut.

2016
On 14 June, Liddle re-signed with the Tigers on a 2-year contract until the end of 2018. With Robbie Farah absent for State of Origin, and Manaia Cherrington and Matt Ballin injured, Wests Tigers were given a dispensation for Liddle to make his debut in round 18 against the Canterbury-Bankstown Bulldogs, despite exceeding the 2nd tier salary cap. Coming off the bench, he scored a try early in the 2nd half. Coach Jason Taylor said, "For salary cap reasons he probably won't play any more part. That's disappointing. He didn't look out of place for a second against a team with those big guys and his defence was superb."

2017
With Farah leaving the club, Liddle was a regular in first grade, mostly playing from the bench and interchanging with Matt McIlwrick at hooker. From round 16, he changed to the starting hooker, but 3 games later he suffered a season-ending shoulder injury. Scoring 3 tries from his 13 appearances, Liddle was awarded the Wests Tigers Rookie of the Year. Mid-season he signed an extension to remain at the club to the end of 2019.

2018
Returning from his shoulder injury, Liddle played on the bench in round 4. He said, "Definitely long-term, I want to wear that No.9 jersey. I think at the moment I just want to keep on playing footy and getting my match fitness up and getting my tackling right. But I was pretty happy with the hit out today." He made his return to the starting team in round 6, and scored a penalty try against the Manly Warringah Sea Eagles, after he was illegally tackled without the ball by Daly Cherry-Evans, causing him to fumble the grounding of the ball. The Tigers went on to win 38-12.

Injury again limited Liddle in 2018, making 13 appearances with only two in the starting side. With former captain Robbie Farah returning to the club mid-season, all of Liddle's subsequent appearances were spelling Farah. Liddle said, "He's come back and showed me a few things. I watch him at training on the field and you learn off him. I probably haven't played as much as I've wanted to play this year, but it's all a learning process."

2019
Liddle remained the second string hooker behind Farah in 2019. After missing the beginning of the season with rehabilitation, he played 10 games off the bench mid-season before returning to reserve grade. With Farah suffering an injury in round 21, Liddle was recalled as starting hooker in round 22, but was taken from the field with a serious knee injury after just six minutes of play.
He was ruled out for the remainder of the season with a torn anterior cruciate ligament, saying, "I’ll come back bigger and stronger. I’ve had two shoulder recos and you just take it day by day. You don’t think about the long haul, you just think about the daily things, doing the recovery. It’s all mental really. You get back on the horse and plough ahead."

2020
After almost a year out of the game, Liddle made his return for the Wests Tigers against Canterbury-Bankstown which Wests won 29-28, with Liddle passing the ball to Luke Brooks for the game-winning field goal. Coach Maguire said, "Liddsy was steering the team around well. We saw that at the back end of the game when he did that to get the field goal. He had us in the right position." The following week, he scored his first try of the season against the Sydney Roosters in a 38-16 defeat.

2021
Starting the season at hooker, Liddle was dropped in favour of Jake Simpkin for 4 weeks from round 6, returning to the starting spot in round 9. In June, he signed a contract extension to remain at the club until the end of 2023. Days later, he scored a 95 metre runaway try as Wests Tigers toppled the previously undefeated Penrith. Trainer Robbie Farah said, "He started the year well, but he tapered off a bit so it was probably a kick in the guts to be dropped, but the way he’s reacted has been great to see. I think he’s come into the side a better player."

2022
Liddle played a total of 11 games for Wests Tigers in the 2022 NRL season as the club finished bottom of the table for the first time.
On September 14, Liddle was released from the final year of his contract with Wests to take up a deal with St. George Illawarra for the 2023 season.

References

External links

NRL profile
Wests Tigers profile

1996 births
Living people
Rugby league hookers
Rugby league players from Gosford, New South Wales
St. George Illawarra Dragons players
Wests Tigers players
Wests Tigers NSW Cup players
Western Suburbs Magpies NSW Cup players
Wyong Roos players